Motion Pictures, S.A. is a Spanish production and distribution company of audiovisual TV products, founded by Enrique Uviedo and established in Barcelona since 1975.

The company has licensed foreign shows in Spain, such as Teenage Mutant Ninja Turtles, and co-produced its own animated series, including two with Walt Disney Television Animation Spain, SA.

Motion Pictures' logo looks very similar to the classic Motown logo, as well the name of the company.

Company history 
The company was founded in 1977 by its president Uviedo Enrique Herrera. The first activities of the company were the production of low-budget films while working in the productions of Italian, American, and British filmmakers who came to shoot in Spain.

In the early 1980s, Motion Pictures began to buy broadcasting rights, primarily video and television. Coinciding with the end of the video boom in the early 1990s, the company began to buy American film catalogs for television distribution, with titles such as Star Wars, The Empire Strikes Back, The Return of the Jedi, Apocalypse Now, and Tucker.

Alongside this films' acquisition policy was resumed the production of Spanish films, including Historias de la puta mili, sold in over forty countries. In addition, a series with the same title was produced for Tele 5, which won the “Ondas” Award in 1995 - Best Fiction Series of the Year.

Motion Pictures has had an extended animation catalog series. It has brought notable series to Spain for more than 20 years, such as Teenage Mutant Ninja Turtles, Inspector Gadget, The Smurfs, Calimero, and Dennis the Menace.

Motion Pictures has heavily invested for the sales of international rights and is now available in international markets such as Natpe, Foorum TV, Los Angeles Screenings, Mip TV, Latin American Screens, and Mipcom.

Produced and coproduced series 
Since 2001 Motion Pictures is coproducing its own animated series currently being broadcast around the world: 
Sandokan - (26 x 26 ') - Coproduction with RAI and TVE
Ivanhoe - (52 x 26') -  Coproduction with France Animation, France 2 TV, Cinar and Ravensburger Films.
Carland Cross - (26 x 26 ') - Coproduction with Odec Kid, TF 1 and Canal Plus.
Prudence Investigations - (52 X 26 ') - Coproduction with TF 1 and TVE.
Raindrop, the water is adventure - (26 x 26 ') - With the collaboration of TVE, TV3 and CHANNEL 9, it was premiered by TVE audience to be a leader in its time slot. Currently RAINDROP has been sold in more than 70 countries
LMN´S - (52x13 ') - Coproduced with TVE, TV3 and RAI.
Van Dogh - (104x4 ')
Boom & Reds - (104x4 ') - both produced in our own studio in Barcelona, animation in 3D HDTV.
Telmo and Tula, little cooks - (52x7 ') - 3D animation coproduced by Walt Disney Television Animation Spain, SA
Telmo and Tula, arts and crafts - (52x7 ') - 3D animation coproduced by Walt Disney Television Animation Spain, SA
The Zumbers - (150x3 ')
Green Light (26x5 ') - Traffic Safety educational series
Glumpers - (104x2 ') - Slapstick comedy without dialogue in coproduction with TVC (Television of Catalonia).
Pumpkin Reports - (52x13') - Sci Fi animation comedy in coproduction with Sample, RAI Fiction, Young Jump, Clan and TVC (Television of Catalonia).
Mya Go - (104x5') - pre-school series in coproduction with Piranha Bar, RTEjr, Clan, Super3 and Gloobinho.

Rainbow Spain 
Recently, Motion Pictures and Rainbow S.p.A., an Italian animation producers, announced the agreement reached for the establishment of a joint venture in Spain. The head office of this new company, named RAINBOW Spain, will be located at Motion Pictures offices in Barcelona and will also have an office in Madrid. RAINBOW Spain will be responsible for managing the licensing of TV rights and merchandising of the properties of both companies in the Spanish market of the series: Winx Club (104 x 26’), Huntik (26 x 26’) and Poppixie (52x13’), among others being produced right now.

Film production companies of Spain
Film production companies of the United States
Spanish animation studios
Mass media in Barcelona